Time for Sorrow Hasn't Come Yet is a 1995 Russian drama film directed by Sergey Selyanov.

Plot 
The film takes place in one settlement, in which a person suddenly appears and calls himself a Surveyor, after which the inhabitants of the village suddenly disperse, and on the eve of the era of Aquarius gather again.

Cast 
 Valeriy Priyomykhov as Ivanov
 Pyotr Mamonov as Mefodi
 Marina Levtova as Lyalya / Sonya
 Mikhail Svetin as Zhibbayev
 Sergei Parshin as Grinya
 Semyon Strugachyov as Shmukler
 Juris Strenga as Vilman
 Viktor Dement as Yashka
 Pyotr Vasilyev as Ivanov as child (as Petya Vasilyev)
 Tatyana Zhuravlyova as Shepotukha

References

External links 
 

1995 films
1990s Russian-language films
Russian drama films
1995 drama films